The Terra Ceia Village Improvement Association Hall built in 1906 is an historic building located at 1505 Center Road in Terra Ceia, Florida. Also known as the Terra Ceia Woman's Club, it was added to the National Register of Historic Places on September 16, 2003, as part of the Clubhouses of Florida's Woman's Clubs Multiple Property Submission (MPS).

See also
 List of Registered Historic Woman's Clubhouses in Florida

References

National Register of Historic Places in Manatee County, Florida
Women's clubs in Florida
1906 establishments in Florida
Buildings and structures completed in 1906